The 37th Infantry Battalion "Guardia Presidencial" (Presidential Guard Battalion) (Spanish: Batallón de Infantería Guardia Presidencial, BIGUP) is the President of Colombia's honor guard service unit under the National Army of Colombia. It is composed of five companies, a historical company and one artillery battery plus a military band, a fanfare trumpet section and a Corps of Drums. It is stationed at the Casa de Nariño in Bogotá and carries the traditions of Simon Bolivar's infantry guards company raised in the midst of the Spanish American wars of independence in 1815.

History 

In June 1814, the President of the Second Republic of Venezuela Simón Bolívar, inspected the Guard of Honor upon his return to Santa Fe. The guard, which was called the Guardia de Honor del libertador Simón Bolívar (Honor Guard of the Liberator Simón Bolívar), provided the basis for the 37th Infantry Presidential Guard Battalion.

On December 7, 1927, President Miguel Abadía Méndez signed a decree officially founding the Presidential Guard. On August 16, 1928, the battalion was given its current name, with its first commander being Lieutenant Colonel Roberto Perea Sanclemente. Memorable actions of this battalion are remembered such as the protection given to the president  during the violent acts of the Bogotazo (April 9, 1948) and during the Palace of Justice Siege on November 6, 1985. Resolution 3446 of August 17, 1955, created the medallion “Guardia Presidencial” and Decree 1880 of 1988 ruled the award merits for this prize given to the distinguished members of the battalion for their loyalty, service and good behavior.

Functions 
The battalion provides security to the Presidency of Colombia by meeting the requirements imposed on it by the Secretary of Security of the President of Colombia. The Fergusson Company is the chief ceremonial unit in the battalion, being in charge of providing an Honor Guard during military ceremonies such as parades, state visits, and funeral honors. On select days at the Casa de Nariño, the public can witness the flag lowering and raising ceremony in the afternoon performed by the battalion's personnel. The other 4 companies are solely responsible for the logistical security of the head of state. It reports to the 13th Brigade part of the 5th Division's and is periodically deployed in wartime and in situations of social unrest, but mostly in the security of the President of Colombia and his/her family.

Changing of the Guard
The Changing of the Guard (Cambio de guardia) is a 105 year old traditional military parade of the battalion that takes place on Wednesdays, Fridays and Sundays at 4 PM (COT) in the central square (Plaza de Armas) of the Casa de Nariño. It marks the changing of the security command at the palace. The changing of the guard involves the Fergusson Company and the battalion's military band and corps of drums.

Composition 

The battalion is part of 13th Infantry Brigade of the Army's 5th Division, and is composed of 1,400 people: 29 officers, 116 NCOs, 1,189 soldiers and 66 civilian personnel. Today the Presidential Guard Battalion is currently subdivided into several companies:

 Battalion HHC
 Córdoba Infantry Company
 Rondon Cavalry Squadron
 Ricaurte Artillery Battery
 Caldas Engineering Company (named after Francisco José de Caldas)
 Fergusson Company
BIGUP Battalion  Presidential War Band and Corps of Drums
 Foot Guards Company of the Presidential Military Household
 Santander Training Company
 Nariño Training Company
 3rd AFEUR Company (Special Forces)

Their headquarters are located in front of the building of the Ministry of Finance and Public Credit on the south side of the Casa de Nariño. Their motto is “En Defensa del Honor Hasta la Muerte” (“In defense of honor till death”).

List of Commanders 
 Lieutenant Colonel Luis Fernando Londoño Villamizar (2008 - 2013)
 Lieutenant Colonel Antonio Jose Dangond (2013 - 2015)

Gallery

See also 
 Guard of honour
 National Army of Colombia
 5th Division (Colombia)
 Casa de Nariño

References

External Media
 An Honours Ceremony Performed By the Battalion
 Cómo vive una ceremonia un soldado del Batallón Guardia Presidencial

Military units and formations of Colombia
Guards of honour